Leonard Harold Claydon (December 31, 1915 in Winnipeg, Manitoba – December 8, 1971) was a politician in Manitoba, Canada. He served in the Manitoba legislature as a Progressive Conservative from 1969 until his death. Prime minister John Diefenbaker was a very good friend who visited Leonard in the hospital and wrote the eulogy at his funeral. His funeral was announced on the local news.

Claydon was educated at Winnipeg public schools and St. Johns College. He worked as a merchant and technician, and served in the Royal Canadian Air Force from 1940 to 1946, spending three and a half years overseas and reaching the rank of Flight Lieutenant. In the 1960s he owned and operated a hardware store on Sherbrook Street in Winnipeg with his supportive wife Sarah (Sadie) and three young children; Marilyn, Robert and Anne Claydon. The Claydon Hardware Store sold the first black and white televisions to Winnipeggers and stocked an assortment of appliances, toolkits of hammers, nails and radios. He was a Scottish Rite freemason and a member of the United Church of Canada. Claydon also worked for the Canadian Pacific Railway and Trans-Canada Airlines.

He was elected to the Winnipeg City Council in the 1960 municipal election, was re-elected four times. He chaired the city's Public Works Committee from 1961 to 1969, and served as acting deputy mayor in 1968.

Claydon won a by-election for the Manitoba legislature in the riding of Wolseley in February 1969, following the resignation of former Premier Dufferin Roblin.<ref>Claydon won the Progressive Conservative nomination unopposed.  See Winnipeg Free Press', 9 January 1969, p. 3.</ref> He remained a member of the Winnipeg City Council after his provincial election.

Claydon was re-elected in the 1969 provincial election, but died two years later in Winnipeg after a lengthy illness.

Leonard Claydon was a great humanitarian helping individuals in need. He went out of his way to help individuals often marginalized by society. Leonard helped find an apartment that accepted a guide dog for a blind tenant and woman who was Deaf in search for a job and lodgings. Leonard also was awarded medals of bravery for saving lives from drowning in Lake Winnipeg where he had a yacht.

He played an important role in returning a steam train now known as the Prairie Dog Central into service in the Winnipeg area. 
Mr. Leonard Claydon acquired the salvaged steam engine to a new name, The Claydon Cannonball prior to being called the Prairie Dog Central''. The steam engine was a great pride and joy for him. Leonard Claydon lived to see his first grandson David Robert Leonard Claydon born in 1970 from Robert and Joan Claydon, unfortunately he did not live to see eleven subsequent grandchildren of Jennifer Lauren Claydon, Jason Edward Claydon; Leonard's daughters Marilyn Claydon and Louise Anne Claydon.

Electoral record

References

Progressive Conservative Party of Manitoba MLAs
1915 births
1971 deaths
Winnipeg city councillors
Royal Canadian Air Force personnel of World War II
Royal Canadian Air Force officers